Lufu-Toto, formerly known as Cattier after Félicien Cattier, is a locality in the province of Bas-Congo in the Democratic Republic of the Congo. It is a secondary station on the Matadi-Kinshasa railway line, housing the depots of the Office National des Transports (ONATRA).

The locality is also known as the birthplace of the musician Ray Lema.

Populated places in Kongo Central